This is a list of lakes in Cambodia.
Tonlé Sap: a giant lake in the center of Cambodia.
Yak Loum: a lake formed from a former crater.

See also
 

Cambodia
Lakes